Fellini's Pizza is an Italian restaurant founded in Atlanta, Georgia on May 5, 1982 by Clay Harper of the Coolies and Mike Nelson. It has 7 locations and is known for its Atlanta style pizza. Its first location was near Little Five Points. It was voted "best pizza" in 2013 by The Emory Wheel.

References

External links 
 

Restaurants in Atlanta
Restaurants established in 1982
Italian restaurants in the United States
Pizza chains of the United States
1982 establishments in Georgia (U.S. state)